Ravenswood "Old Town" Historic District is a national historic district located at Ravenswood, Jackson County, West Virginia. It encompasses 313 contributing buildings and two contributing structures, the Ohio River Rail Road Steel Pratt-through truss Bridge and Concrete bridge on State Route 68 over Sandy Creek.  It includes the commercial and civic core of the town, and surrounding residential buildings. It includes example of popular architectural styles of the mid- to late-19th and early-20th century, including Greek Revival, Gothic Revival, Queen Anne, Colonial Revival, Italianate, Craftsman, and Bungalow. Notable buildings include the McIntosh Building, First Baptist Church (c. 1876), Randolph Building/Caldwell Building (1907), the Grace Episcopal Church (c. 1900); Our Savior Evangelical Lutheran Church (c. 1928), Ravenswood Community Center (1938), and McIntosh House (c. 1890).

It was listed on the National Register of Historic Places in 2007.

References

National Register of Historic Places in Jackson County, West Virginia
Historic districts in Jackson County, West Virginia
Commercial buildings on the National Register of Historic Places in West Virginia
Houses on the National Register of Historic Places in West Virginia
Victorian architecture in West Virginia
Greek Revival architecture in West Virginia
Gothic Revival architecture in West Virginia
Queen Anne architecture in West Virginia
Colonial Revival architecture in West Virginia
Italianate architecture in West Virginia
American Craftsman architecture in West Virginia
Bungalow architecture in West Virginia
Houses in Jackson County, West Virginia
Historic districts on the National Register of Historic Places in West Virginia